Elections to Tower Hamlets London Borough Council were held on 7 May 1998.  The whole council was up for election and the Labour party kept overall control of the council.

Election result

Ward results

References
"Council poll results", The Guardian 9 May 1998 page 16
Ward results

1998
1998 London Borough council elections
20th century in the London Borough of Tower Hamlets